Roslin Glen Country Park is a wooded glen in the North Esk Valley, near the village of Roslin in Scotland. It contains walks with several places of interest along the way, including Rosslyn Chapel, Roslin Castle, Wallace's Cave and Hawthornden Castle.

References

Country parks in Scotland
Inventory of Gardens and Designed Landscapes
Parks in Midlothian